Prairie City High School may refer to:

Bushnell-Prairie City High School, Bushnell, Illinois
Prairie City High School (Iowa), Prairie City, Iowa
Prairie City School, Prairie City, Oregon